Line Rochefort is a Canadian scientist specializing in peatland ecology.

Life
She grew up in a small town near Chicoutimi and earned a BSc in biology from Laval University, a MSc in botany from the University of Alberta and a PhD in botany from the University of Cambridge (1992). Her master's work included research into the impact of acid rain in Canada's Experimental Lakes Area. 
She is a professor in the Department of Plant Sciences at Laval University. 
Rochefort has held the Natural Sciences and Engineering Research Council's Industrial Research chair for Peatland Management since 2003.

She has worked with the Canadian peat industry on peatland restoration after extraction of peat has been completed in fens and bogs. In 2011, she received the International Peatland Society's Award of Excellence.

References 

Date of birth missing (living people)
Living people
Canadian ecologists
Women ecologists
Université Laval alumni
University of Alberta alumni
Alumni of the University of Cambridge
Academic staff of Université Laval
21st-century Canadian biologists
21st-century Canadian women scientists
Year of birth missing (living people)